is a town located in Kushiro Subprefecture, Hokkaido, Japan. As of September 2016, it has an estimated population of 7,862 and an area of 1,099.41 km2.

History 
1923: Kumaushi Village (熊牛村) is formed.
1929: Village renamed to Shibecha.
1950: Shibecha Village becomes Shibecha Town.

Climate

Mascots

They are bovines with a strong sense of justice.
Milkcook is a mild-mannered dairy cow. She is a chef who can cook fast. She will moo if she fails to cook something good. As a result of her cooking skills, she promotes hospitality in the town while promoting the importance of milk. She became mascot in Spring 2006. 
Kurobe Happy is an optimistic bull who loves matsuris. He wears a blue happi. As a result of his fascination of festivals, he promotes events in the town while promoting the importance of beef. He became mascot during the 2011 Fall Matsuri.

Notable people from Shibecha
Nobukatsu Fujioka, professor of education
Keiko Takahashi, actress

References

External links

Official Website 

Towns in Hokkaido